The 1970 Rugby League World Cup Final was the conclusive game of the 1970 Rugby League World Cup tournament and was played between Great Britain and Australia on 8 November 1970 at the Headingley ground in Leeds, England.

Background

The 1970 Rugby League World Cup was the fifth staging of the Rugby League World Cup since its inauguration in 1954, and the first since the 1968 tournament. The tournament was held in the England from 21 October, culminating in the final between Great Britain and Australia on 8 November.

Great Britain

Scores and results list Australia's points tally first.

Great Britain were undefeated going into the final.

Australia

Scores and results list Great Britain's points tally first.

Australia, France and New Zealand all finished with one win each. Australia advanced to the Final by virtue of a better for and against record.

Match details

Having retained the Ashes against Australia during their 1970 Australasian tour, Great Britain were favourites to win the final, which would become known as the 'Battle of Headingley' due to its brutality. However it went completely against expectations as Britain failed to play any decent football despite overwhelming possession. The Kangaroos led 5–4 at half-time with a try to Australian three-quarter, Father John Cootes. They went on to utilise their meagre chances to the full, running out 12–7 victors. The game itself was an extended punch-up. The only surprise was that it took 79 minutes before anyone was sent off. Two sacrificial lambs, Billy Smith of Australia and Syd Hynes of Britain, were sent off the field in the last minute for what had been going unpunished throughout the game.

Great Britain, having been undefeated in the World Cup, felt that there should not have been a need to play a final, especially as they had already defeated Australia 11-4 at Headingley in the second game of the tournament.

(Note: Although Reilly recalls a post-match incident between Atkinson and Cootes, what actually happened was Australian fullback Eric Simms attempted to shake hands with Atkinson after the game, but was instead greeted with a headbutt by the frustrated Lions winger. This led to a wild post-match brawl between the teams that had to be broken up by referee Fred Lindop, his two touch judges, and the Leeds City Police.)

References

Rugby League World Cup finals
final